Vaca Frita (literally "Fried Cow") is a Cuban dish consisting of fried and shredded skirt or flank steak.  It is often topped with sauteed onions with a squeeze of lime, and served with rice and black beans. It is prepared by sauteeing slow cooked steak.

See also 
 Cuisine of Cuba
 Ropa Vieja

References

Cuban cuisine
Ropa Vieja